This is a list of things named after Huey P. Long, the 40th governor of Louisiana (1928-1932) and US Senator (1932-1935).

Bridges
 Huey P. Long Bridge, Baton Rouge
 Huey P. Long Bridge, Jefferson Parish
 Long–Allen Bridge, Harrisonburg
 Long–Allen Bridge, Jonesville
 Long–Allen Bridge, Morgan City
 Long–Allen Bridge, Red River

Buildings
 Huey P. Long Field House, Louisiana State University, Baton Rouge

Statues
Huey Long, National Statuary Hall Collection, Washington, D.C.

References

Long, Huey P
Memorials